51 Pegasi b, officially named Dimidium , and also known as Bellerophon , is an extrasolar planet approximately  away in the constellation of Pegasus. It was the first exoplanet to be discovered orbiting a main-sequence star, the Sun-like 51 Pegasi, and marked a breakthrough in astronomical research. It is the prototype for a class of planets called hot Jupiters.

In 2017, traces of water were discovered in the planet's atmosphere.  In 2019, the Nobel Prize in Physics was awarded in part for the discovery of 51 Pegasi b.

Name
51 Pegasi is the Flamsteed designation of the host star. The planet was originally designated 51 Pegasi b by Michel Mayor and Didier Queloz, who discovered the planet in December 1995. The following year it was unofficially dubbed "Bellerophon" by astronomer Geoffrey Marcy, who followed the convention of naming planets after Greek and Roman mythological figures (Bellerophon is a figure from Greek mythology who rode the winged horse Pegasus).

In July 2014, the International Astronomical Union launched NameExoWorlds, a process for giving proper names to certain exoplanets and their host stars. The process involved public nomination and voting for the new names. In December 2015, the IAU announced the winning name for this planet was Dimidium. 'Dimidium' is Latin for 'half', referring to the planet's mass of approximately half the mass of Jupiter.

Discovery 

The exoplanet's discovery was announced on October 6, 1995, by Michel Mayor and Didier Queloz of the University of Geneva in the journal Nature. They used the radial velocity method with the ELODIE spectrograph on the Observatoire de Haute-Provence telescope in France and made world headlines with their announcement. For this discovery, they were awarded the 2019 Nobel Prize in Physics.

The planet was discovered using a sensitive spectroscope that could detect the slight and regular velocity changes in the star's spectral lines of around 70 metres per second. These changes are caused by the planet's gravitational effects from just 7 million kilometres' distance from the star.

Within a week of the announcement, the planet was confirmed by another team using the Lick Observatory in California.

This was the first discovery of an exoplanet orbiting a Sun-like star (the first exoplanet discovery was made by Aleksander Wolszczan in 1992, around pulsar PSR 1257). It marked a turning point and forced astronomers to accept that giant planets could exist in short-period orbits. Once astronomers realized that it was worth looking for giant planets with the currently available technology, much more telescope time was devoted to radial velocity planet searches, and hence many more exoplanets in the Sun's neighborhood were discovered.

Physical characteristics

After its discovery, many teams confirmed the planet's existence and obtained more observations of its properties. It was discovered that the planet orbits the star in around four days. At the time, the presence of a huge world so close to its star was not compatible with theories of planet formation and was considered an anomaly. However, since then, numerous other "hot Jupiters" have been discovered (such as 55 Cancri and τ Boötis), and astronomers are revising their theories of planet formation to account for them by studying orbital migration.

Assuming the planet is perfectly grey with no greenhouse or tidal effects, and a Bond albedo of 0.1, the temperature would be . This is between the predicted temperatures of HD 189733 b and HD 209458 b (–), before they were measured.

In the report of the discovery, it was initially speculated that 51 Pegasi b was the stripped core of a brown dwarf of a decomposed star and was therefore composed of heavy elements, but it is now believed to be a gas giant. It is sufficiently massive that its thick atmosphere is not blown away by the star's solar wind.

51 Pegasi b probably has a greater radius than that of Jupiter despite its lower mass. This is because its superheated atmosphere must be puffed up into a thick but tenuous layer surrounding it. Beneath this, the gases that make up the planet would be so hot that the planet would glow red. Clouds of silicates may exist in the atmosphere.

The planet is tidally locked to its star, always presenting the same face to it.

The planet (with Upsilon Andromedae b) was deemed a candidate for aperture polarimetry by Planetpol. It is also a candidate for "near-infrared characterisation.... with the VLTI Spectro-Imager".

Claims of direct detection of visible light
The first ever direct detection of the visible light spectrum reflected from an exoplanet has been made by an international team of astronomers on 51 Pegasi b. The astronomers studied light from 51 Pegasi b using the High Accuracy Radial velocity Planet Searcher (HARPS) instrument at the European Southern Observatory's La Silla Observatory in Chile. This detection allowed the inference of a mass of 0.46 Jupiter masses. The optical detection could not be replicated in 2020, implying the planet has an albedo below 0.15. Measurements in 2021 have marginally detected a polarized reflected light signal, which, while they cannot place limits on the albedo without assumptions made about the scattering mechanisms, could suggest a high albedo.

See also
 PSR B1257+12 B
 PSR B1257+12 C
 HD 209458 b

References

Further reading
 (web version)

External links

 
 
 
 
 

Hot Jupiters
Pegasus (constellation)
Exoplanets discovered in 1995
Giant planets
Exoplanets detected by radial velocity
Articles containing video clips
Exoplanets with proper names